Fahad Al-Munaif may refer to:

Fahad Al-Munaif (footballer, born 1989), Saudi footballer
Fahad Al-Munaif (footballer, born 1994), Saudi footballer